The 2022 Cornell Big Red football team represented Cornell University as a member of the Ivy League during the 2022 NCAA Division I FCS football season. The team was led by ninth-year head coach David Archer and played its home games at Schoellkopf Field.

Previous season

The Big Red finished the 2021 season with a record of 2–8, 1–6 in Ivy League play, to finish in a three-way tie for last place.

Schedule

Game summaries

VMI

Yale

at Colgate

Harvard

Lehigh

at Brown

at Princeton

Penn

Dartmouth

at Columbia

References

Cornell
Cornell Big Red football seasons
Cornell Big Red football